is a 1997 Japanese anime science fiction film written by Hideaki Anno, directed by Anno and Kazuya Tsurumaki, and animated by Gainax and Production I.G. It serves as an alternate ending to the television series Neon Genesis Evangelion, which aired from 1995 to 1996 and ended with two episodes that became controversial.

The story follows the teenagers Shinji Ikari, Rei Ayanami and Asuka Langley Soryu, who pilot mechas called Evangelion to defeat enemies who threaten humanity named Angels. Shinji is subjected to the Human Instrumentality Project, a process in which human souls are merged into a single divine entity. The film features the voice actors of the original series, including Megumi Ogata as Shinji, Yuko Miyamura as Asuka, and Megumi Hayashibara as Rei.

Shortly before The End of Evangelions release, Anno and Gainax released another film, Neon Genesis Evangelion: Death and Rebirth, which summarizes the first twenty-four episodes of the series. Like Death & Rebirth, the creators conceived The End of Evangelion as a duology comprising "Episode 25: Love Is Destructive" and "Episode 26: I Need You", remakes of the last two episodes of the original television series. In 1998, the overlapping films were edited together and reissued as Revival of Evangelion.

The End of Evangelion was a box-office success, grossing . It was honoured at the Awards of the Japanese Academy, the Animation Kobe, and the 15th Golden Gloss Award. The movie also won the 1997 Animage Anime Grand Prix, and was praised for its violence, direction, editing, emotional power, and script, though some reviewers criticized its oblique religious symbolism and abstraction.

Plot

Episode 25': "Air" / "Love Is Destructive"
Teenager Shinji Ikari is the pilot of Evangelion Unit 01, one of several giant cyborgs designed to fight hostile supernatural entities called Angels. Shinji is distraught after having had to kill his friend Kaworu Nagisa, who revealed himself as an Angel in human form. He visits his fellow pilot Asuka Langley Soryu in a hospital where she lies comatose. Trying to shake her awake, he accidentally exposes her breasts and masturbates over her comatose body.

Nerv, the paramilitary organization that controls the Evangelions, is controlled by a secretive committee called Seele, which has been planning to initiate an event called the Third Impact, which will wipe out life on Earth and achieve Human Instrumentality. Seele discovers that Shinji's father Gendo Ikari, the commander of Nerv, intends to create his own version of the Third Impact to reunite with his deceased wife Yui, whose soul resides in Unit 01. Seele dispatches the Japanese military to seize control of Nerv and exterminate its staff. Nerv major Misato Katsuragi orders Asuka to be moved to Evangelion Unit 02 and placed at the bottom of a lake. Misato, who wants Shinji to defend Nerv, rescues him from the invading troops and drags him to Unit 01's bay doors but is fatally shot in the process. Before her death, Misato implores Shinji to pilot Unit 01 and kisses him. Shinji discovers Unit 01 has been immobilized in bakelite.

Gendo meets with pilot Rei Ayanami, who carries the soul of the Angel Lilith. Gendo possesses the body of the Angel Adam, and he is intent on combining it with Lilith to begin the Third Impact. Inside Unit 02, Asuka overcomes her trauma upon learning that the soul of her deceased mother is inside Unit 02. She then re-activates the unit, and destroys the military forces, but Seele's new mass-produced Evangelion units arrive. Asuka defeats them, but they reanimate and disembowel her and Unit 02. Unit 01 breaks free of the bakelite and ascends above Nerv headquarters. Piloting it, Shinji sees Seele's units carrying the mutilated remains of Unit 02 and screams.

Episode 26': "Sincerely Yours" / "I Need You"
Rei betrays Gendo and takes Adam for herself. She merges with Lilith, who changes into a gigantic, white version of Rei. The mass-produced units pull Unit 01 into the sky and crucify it, beginning the ritual to trigger the Third Impact.

Lilith makes contact with Shinji. After several dreamlike contemplations, including fighting with and strangling Asuka, who refuses his pleas for help and understanding, Shinji concludes he is alone and everyone in the world, including himself, should die. Lilith responds by initiating the Third Impact and dissolving human bodies into the primordial fluid LCL, reforming their souls into a single consciousness. After more contemplation, Shinji rejects this new state, realizing life is about experiencing pain as well as joy. Shinji's rejection causes the destruction of Lilith and the souls of humanity are set free. Yui's soul tells Shinji anyone can return if they have the will to, and they bid farewell, Yui leaving Earth in Unit-01's body to serve as an eternal monument to humanity.

Sometime later, the rematerialized Shinji and Asuka lie on a post-apocalyptic shoreline. Shinji catches a glimpse of an ethereal Rei before being startled by Asuka. Shinji begins to strangle her, but when she caresses his face, he stops. Shinji breaks down in tears, while Asuka voices disgust.

Cast

Production

Pre-production
After the first broadcast of the animated series Neon Genesis Evangelion, some viewers felt unsatisfied. According to official information and staff statements, problems with the schedule, delays in production, and some personal indecision on the part of the director Hideaki Anno led to the abandonment of the original script of the penultimate episode. In the case of the last episode, "Take care of yourself", Anno stated in an interview he had roughly followed the original plan instead. The two final episodes, which focus on psychological introspection and long inner monologues of the protagonists, met the expectations of Gainax studio's staff but became a source of discussion for fans; although the finale concluded the most important psychological themes of the series, it abandoned the main plot, giving rise to controversy. The issue was debated throughout Japan, fueling the series' already-high popularity. Fans demanded a new ending or, at least, a conclusion that answered the open questions. Anno also fell into a difficult psychological state. He perceived a lot of criticism towards his work, and felt he was accused of being sloppy and negligent. He also read online discussions in which some people argued about the best way to kill him; Anno thus no longer wanted to work in animation and attempted to commit suicide.

On April 26, 1996, about a month after the final episode of the series was aired, the magazine Monthly Shōnen Ace announced a remake of the final two episodes and a feature-length film would be produced. The first feature film, Neon Genesis Evangelion: Death and Rebirth (1997), was intended to conclude the story of the original series and the second installment would have been a new story with a completely different setting.

The project was intended to be released as an original video animation (OVA) for the home-video market, but due to the series' success a Japanese consortium financed the project with a fund so high they chose to release it as a film. The consortium included Imagica, a film post-production company, and fashion companies such as Fiorucci, Americanino, and Edwin. At the suggestion of Neon Genesis Evangelion character designer Yoshiyuki Sadamoto, the unreleased film was to be set in winter, in contrast to the eternal summer in which Japan is trapped in the animated series. Anno also considered setting the show in winter; he wanted to recreate battles between Evangelions on snow-covered mountains, regardless the technical difficulty executing this idea would involve. In a post-apocalyptic scenario, with Earth almost destroyed and unlivable, humans would live inside an area protected by a barrier named AT field. The Angels, the main enemies of the original series, would have attacked the area, concentrating their forces on the only bridge connecting it to the rest of the world, devouring human beings.

The project was planned for release in mid-1997. The production of "Rebirth", however, was delayed; so much material was produced it was necessary to break it up into two releases. In addition, some staff felt reluctant and harassed by the production schedule, and the release of the second movie with new material was indefinitely postponed. In March 1997 Death and Rebirth was released. The work has two segments; one of sixty minutes and one of twenty-five minutes. The first segment,  or "Death", is a montage of animated clips from the first twenty-four episodes of the series and some unreleased sequences. The last segment  ("Rebirth") became a preview of the true ending of the series. The segment includes the first twenty minutes of the following installment, ending at the beginning of the confrontation between Eva-02 and the Eva Series. Gainax then announced a second concluding feature film, which would have the same ending told from a new perspective.

Direction and development

After the series concluded, Anno fell into a difficult psychological state and his friend and anime director Hayao Miyazaki advised him to take a break. The director followed Miyazaki's advice and rested for a few months. Production for the film version of Neon Genesis Evangelion officially began on November 8, 1996. The directing of "Air" was entrusted to Kazuya Tsurumaki, who had worked as an assistant director on the television series. Other Gainax studio staff members, such as Masayuki and Shinji Higuchi, were involved in the process, and they collaborated on storyboards following Tsurumaki's direction. Anno directed "Sincerely Yours", and was assisted in the storyboard phase by Higuchi and Junichi Sato. According to Neon Genesis Evangelion producer Toshimichi Ōtsuki, the staff started working on The End of Evangelion before the series had finished broadcasting, and worked until the last minute to complete the second feature film in time. Gainax initially proposed to call the work Evangelion: Rebirth 2 but the title was later changed during production.

Unlike the big media campaign for Death and Rebirth, there was no special advertising campaign for The End of Evangelion, and promotional activities were minimal. The authors wanted to create a funeral and "bury" Neon Genesis Evangelion; Anno called the work The End of Evangelion to represent the metaphorical death of the Evangelion project; he himself ensured that the work died with his own hands, rather than see its popularity slowly fade away. The feature film was divided into two segments called "Episode 25" and "Episode 26", which are remakes of those in the animated series. Like the episodes of the classic series, the episodes were given a double title; one in Japanese, and one in English. The title of the first segment was initially , a reference to Robert A. Heinlein's science fiction novel of the same name. The staff later opted for "Love is Destructive" or "Air", with the double meaning of "atmosphere" and music. The second episode was given the Japanese title Magokoro wo, kimi ni ("Sincerely Yours"). Following a Gainax studio tradition of titling the final episode of a series from an existing story or feature film, "Sincerely Yours" is a tribute to the film Charly (1968), based on the novel Flowers for Algernon by Daniel Keyes, which was distributed in Japan with the same title. The home video editions of the series also include previews of "Air" and "Sincerely Yours" at each end of the original final episodes.

Writing

Due to time constraints, the original script for "Do you love me?", the twenty-fifth episode of the classic series, went unused. When it was decided to resume Neon Genesis Evangelion, Anno wrote the script of the "Air" segment based on the unused script. The episode was structured to get as close as possible to the ending the authors originally intended. For the second episode "Sincerely Yours", several narrative lines were added to the original script, deepening the themes already proposed in the final episode of the series. The two endings, film and television, were conceived as conceptually identical; unlike the television conclusion, which focuses on the psychology of the protagonists, the film version addresses the Human Instrumentality Project from an external point of view, whereas in the classic series everything was left to the introspection of the main characters. The script's tone was influenced by the staff's mood, since they were tired and exhausted. Shinji's mood changed from the twenty-fifth episode of the classic series, creating inconsistencies. With the sense of tension of the original series gone, the producers had difficulty; Kazuya Tsurumaki worked on the feature film considering it unnecessary until the end.

During the realization of the series and Death and Rebirth, Anno asked anyone who worked on Neon Genesis Evangelion to suggest ways events could be closed; Anno trusted in particular Higuchi, Sadamoto, and Ikuto Yamashita, mecha designer for the series. One of Yamashita's proposals for the never-made feature film involved the Eva-01 attacking the headquarters of the German branch of Nerv, in possession of a weapon called the "Long Range Universal Invasion Cannon", or "Dead God Spine". In the mecha designer's scenario, there would have been a war between Evangelions in a world affected by mysterious rays of light capable of turning people into werewolf-like creatures. Nerv's base would have been a sterilized stronghold surrounded by wolfmen; Shinji in a flashback would have become his Eva, with which he would have swapped bodies. The Evangelion pilots would have had weight in politics but Asuka would have been viewed with suspicion by the Nerv and as a traitor by Germany. In a scene of Yamashita's script, Shinji would have run with the werewolves, acclaimed as their king, while Rei would have cold-bloodedly killed a werewolf, saying she hates animals.

Additional changes were made at the script stage; in one of the opening sequences, for example, Shinji would say goodbye to his two former classmates and friends, Kensuke Aida and Toji Suzuhara, at their middle school in Tokyo-3, just before their sudden departure for Germany. Picking up on the last scene of Neon Genesis Evangelion eighteenth episode, Toji would shoot a basketball while confined to a wheelchair. In "Sincerely Yours" Lilith and the nine Eva Series would form a triangle-shaped pattern, later replaced in the final version by a horizontal Tree of Life. For the last sequence, in which Shinji strangles Asuka until the girl caresses his cheek, Anno based it on an event that happened to an acquaintance of his; the woman on one occasion was strangled by a malicious man but as she was about to be killed, she caressed him. When the man stopped squeezing her neck, the woman regained a cold attitude, uttering the words Asuka would say to Shinji in the original script, .

Voice acting
For Neon Genesis Evangelion: The End of Evangelion, all of the voice actors from the original animated series were called, except for some characters that were excluded from the script during the writing phase, such as Toji Suzuhara and Kensuke Aida. After the last dubbing session, Anno asked the cast to re-record the feature film from scratch; they completed almost every scene with detailed instructions from the director. Anno asked the actors to perform as though it was a live-action film, avoiding the typical dubbing of animated products. When Anno wanted to concentrate on the dialogue and emphasize the acting of the dubbing actors, he decided to point the camera from behind, leaving the characters off-screen or in a long shot, so facial expressions and lip-synching would not affect the dubbing too much. The "Air" scenes already present in "Rebirth" were also re-dubbed.

 
 Megumi Ogata plays Shinji Ikari, the 14-year-old protagonist of Neon Genesis Evangelion. As with the television series, Ogata was comfortable with her role but found screaming during the recording sessions difficult. When dubbing the last scene of the film, in which Shinji strangles Asuka, Ogata strangled her voice actress Yuko Miyamura, who was unable to reproduce realistic strangulation sounds and personally asked her colleague for help. Due to her agitation, Ogata clutched her neck too tightly, risking spoiling her voice and almost preventing her from reciting the remaining lines. Although the scene is only a few minutes long, the recording took about ninety minutes to complete.
 Yuko Miyamura reprises the role of Asuka Langley Soryu. Miyamura influenced the director, changing the details of her character. In the original script, Asuka, having just been throttled by Shinji, would utter the final line, "I can't stand the idea of being killed by someone like you", in the coldest possible tone. Dissatisfied with the line and Miyamura's performance, Anno asked her to imagine a stranger who could rape her at any time but would rather masturbate while watching her sleep sneaking into her room. Anno also asked her what she would say if she suddenly woke up and realized what had happened. Miyamura, disgusted by the scene, told him; . Anno later changed the line.
 Megumi Hayashibara voices Rei Ayanami and Yui Ikari.
 Kotono Mitsuishi plays Major Misato Katsuragi. Mitsuishi found difficulties during recordings because Misato has difficulty talking about her true feelings.
 Fumihiko Tachiki is Gendo Ikari. Tachiki found it difficult to empathize with or understand the character. During the sessions he received support from the staff, being directed step by step by Anno and the sound director. The sessions for Gendo's dubbing lasted about two days.
 Yuriko Yamaguchi returns to the role of Ritsuko Akagi. During the feature film, Ritsuko tries to destroy the Nerv headquarters but is shot dead by her former lover Gendo Ikari. Just before shooting her, Ikari says, "Ritsuko Akagi, actually ...". The final part of the line was not dubbed, leaving it up to the viewer's interpretation to complete it. Ritsuko replies; "You're a liar"; the line required special interpretative and acting skills from Yamaguchi. At the time of dubbing the scene, Anno, noticing her emotional state, gave her a hidden clue. Yamaguchi said; "with that one incredible hint, I, and Ritsuko Akagi, were utterly defeated". The phrase in the original storyboards was supposed to be covered by the sound of an explosion.
 Akira Ishida plays Kaworu Nagisa. Ishida said he found the role "very difficult", and felt "a lot of pressure" during the dubbing of the film version. His emotional tension grew exponentially when he learned that there would be two feature movies, but he was satisfied with his performance.

Animation and sound 
Unlike the television series, which was produced in 16mm format, 35mm film was used for the movie. Kazuchika Kise, a member of Production I.G and art co-director of the television series, and Takeshi Honda, the animator of the opening theme song of Neon Genesis Evangelion, were called as directors of animation and mecha design. Shunji Suzuki, Teishi Hiramatsu, and Anno were chosen as art directors for the twenty-sixth episode. Suzuki and Hiramatsu directed the scenes, while Anno coordinated the fights between the mecha. Tsurumaki was also involved in the animation and was called in at the last minute to help with the coloring process. Masayuki, assistant director of Neon Genesis Evangelion and director of Death, was co-producer of the animation, storyboards, and promotional posters. The staff instructed him to supervise the sequences in which water or waves appear, generally considered the most difficult part of animation. Makoto Kamiya was chosen as special effects director. Hisaki Furukawa and Yoh Yoshinari were appointed assistant animators, Harumi Takaboshi as a colorist, Hiroshi Katō as art director, and Hisao Shirai as director of photography.

Gainax involved the studio Production I.G, which had previously collaborated on some episodes of the original series. Staff also decided to improve the quality of the segment of "Air" already included in "Rebirth". The movie was realized with computer graphics (CG) to give depth to the images and exceed the quality of animation of the original television series. The most important contribution came from the studio Omnibus Japan, which worked on Patlabor 2: The Movie (1993) and Ghost in the Shell (1995). Most of the computer graphics sequences were included at the beginning of the Human Instrumentality and the Third Impact scenes, in which the globe is sprinkled with cruciform lights. The companies divided the tasks by their technical needs and stylistic choices of the scenes. The Production I.G worked on the scenes with 3D computer graphics, which were virtually impossible to achieve with traditional methods, such as the introductory frames of the nine units of the Eva Series, while Gainax studio made scenes that required 2D computer graphics, such as those with computer screens. The sequences of the clash between Unit 02 and the Strategic Self-Defense Forces evoke those of the battle between the Angel Sachiel and the United Nations troops in "Angel Attack", the first episode of the original animated series. While making the feature film, images shown in the original twenty-fifth episode were also added, such as that of Eva-02 and Asuka at the bottom of a lake, and the corpses of Ritsuko and Misato. Besides the CG, short frames with watercolors were also inserted during the Instrumentality scene.

Anno commissioned the sound effects to Toru Noguchi, with whom he had previously worked on the television series Nadia: The Secret of Blue Water. Anno asked Noguchi for maximum realism, to communicate sensations cell animation is not able to express. Particular attention was given to the noise of lasers, the AT Field, and the song of cicadas in the background, which was specially modulated to harmonize with the soundtrack. For the movements of the Evangelion units, he was asked to recreate the noise bundles of wires would make if they contracted as if they were muscles, treating them as living beings. For this reason, sounds usually used in other mecha anime were avoided. The director's demands were meticulous; he specifically asked to use the sound of a World War II machine gun or to reproduce the sounds of particular historical ships during the process, while for the sound of the Prog-Knife they reworked the metallic noise of a real cutter. Noguchi was assisted by Makoto Sumiya, a recording engineer from Tokyo TV Center.

Filming 

For the realization of the segment "Sincerely Yours", it was decided to include some live-action sequences to represent Shinji's inner universe; these include footage of street lamps, trains, graffiti, and the three main female voice actors of the series, Megumi Hayashibara, Kotono Mitsuishi and Yuko Miyamura. The sequences were filmed by a crew called the Special Production Team and were optically distorted. Anno was in charge of the script and was assisted by Shinji Higuchi as the special effects director, with whom he discussed ideas and compared his opinions about every single frame of the sequences. Shinji's world was portrayed with harsher tones than the television ending, so scenes were executed using multiple overlapping or reversed rhodium glasses or sequences in three-dimensional computer graphics. One scene depicts a panorama of a city similar to Tokyo-3, produced by integrating elements in CG. In the final editing staff added a shot of a cinema hall with audiences of the previous Neon Genesis Evangelion feature film, Death and Rebirth.

At the end of the segment, stills depicting graffiti on the walls of the Gainax Shop, doodles, and emails apparently written by fans of the series, including the words , were inserted. The letters were created ad hoc by the staff on the basis of some emails Gainax received. According to an official pamphlet on the movie, the production of the fake e-mails simulated the hypothetical reactions of fans to reflect on the relationships that are established "between a work and its admirers".

Originally, the authors had planned a longer live-action segment with a different content than the final version. The original segment revolved around the character Asuka, who would wake up in an apartment after drinking and spending the night with Toji Suzuhara, with whom she would engage in a sexual relationship. Misato Katsuragi would have been the roommate of the apartment next to hers, and Rei Ayanami, in the original series her rival, would have been her colleague and one of her senpai, experiencing a less-strained relationship. In the alternative universe presented in the live-action footage, Shinji would have never existed; walking through the streets of Tokyo-2 city, however, Asuka would have heard the boy's voice calling her. Some of the unused scenes were used for the film's trailers. During production, Anno decided to cut the segment; according to Evangelion Chronicle magazine, the director decided this after the unplanned double-theatrical release of the ending. Recording work began on January 19, 1997, continuing for several days. Sessions took place in the snowy city of Matsumoto, Nagano Prefecture, where the filming of pylons, bodies of water, and urban scenes for Tokyo-2 was done. Filming also occurred in Kōfu, while those for the scene set in a movie theater were held on March 14 at the premiere of Death and Rebirth. On May 8, filming was held with three dummies of Rei, Asuka, and Misato on a street in a Japanese city, finishing on May 10, when Anno and the other crew members recorded in a playground.

Music

The soundtrack of The End of Evangelion was composed by Shiro Sagisu, who also wrote music for the original series. The film also uses a wide selection of pieces by Johann Sebastian Bach. The twenty-fifth episode was titled "Air" to pay homage to the second movement of the orchestral suite No. 3, known as "Air on the G String", which was used in one of the episode's key scenes. The second half of the film also includes the tenth movement of Bach's cantata "Herz und Mund und Tat und Leben". The use of classical music in violent scenes has been compared to that of Stanley Kubrick's works. In an interview Anno was asked about similarities with Kubrick, but he claimed that his films did not influence him "that much".

A version of "Air on the G String" was arranged and recorded by Sagisu, while an existing recording of "Jesu, Joy of Man's Desiring" was used. Two original songs were written for the movie; "Thanatos: If I can't be yours" is based on the soundtrack of the original series and was performed by gospel music singer Loren and artist Martin Lascelles under the stage name "Mash". Loren recorded the single in June 1997 in London under the supervision of Toshimichi Ōtsuki. The song was later used for credits placed between the two segments of The End of Evangelion.

The second song, "Komm, süsser Tod" ("Come, sweet death") is performed by singer Arianne; the song's English lyrics were translated from a Japanese original by Anno. An official booklet noted that the device of a song written by the director and used in a concluding feature of an animated series had been used years earlier for Mobile Suite Gundam III: Encounters in Space, the third feature of the Mobile Suit Gundam series. The song's melody is homonymous to a Bach symphony (BWV 478) and has been compared to that of "Hey Jude" by The Beatles. Sagisu attempted to spin the guitar sound of "Komm, süsser Tod" in rotation from all surround outputs. The director asked the composer to create a piece so everything from harmonic progressions to instrument overlays would match the screen images. A Japanese song sung by preschool children was used in "Sincerely Yours" to add realism to a playground scene. Producer Satsukawa and a special production team visited Haishima Municipal Kindergarten in Akishima, Japan, which was attended by the daughter of Mitsuhisa Ishikawa, co-founder of Production IG, to record the song.

Eighteen original songs were composed and recorded for The End of Evangelion. In addition to "Komm, süsser Tod", a song called "Everything You've Ever Dreamed" was intended to be included in the Human Instrumentality sequences; it was discarded during production but later included on the album "Refrain of Evangelion". The soundtrack was released as two albums in August and November 1997. The first album, called "The End of Evangelion", included three tracks; "Thanatos -If I Can't Be Yours-", "Komm, süsser Tod", and "II Air". The second album, which is also called The End of Evangelion, contains the other tracks.

Cultural references and themes

Religion, philosophy and psychology

Like the original series, which includes cultural references to philosophy and psychology, a great deal of information was added in The End of Evangelion, in a style called "pedantic" in the official materials. Anno inserted terms to create atmosphere and make it seem as though there is something deeper behind it so, in his own words, he could sound "intelligent". Throughout the film, elements of Judaism and Christianity are mentioned, such as the number of the Beast from the sea 666, the tree of life, the Tree of the Sephiroth, the Catholic stigmata, the universal flood, Noah's ark, the Genesis creation narrative, and the Book of Revelation.

In the early stages of Instrumentality, the Eva Series forms a giant Sephirotic Tree in the sky and each Eva assumes the role of a sephirah. Shinji appears at the sephirah of Tiferet, at the time of his metaphorical sacrifice. Slant Magazine Micheal Peterson noted that Tiferet in the Kabbalah is identified with Christ on the cross, and thus to the place where the sacred meets the profane. Anime Invasion magazine also noted 16th-century Jewish mystical writings predict a decline of the divine light in every human being, followed by the destruction of humanity in a catastrophic event. Eva-01 transforms into the Tree of Life, which an official pamphlet on the film links to the inverted tree of the Kabbalah and a similar tree found in Hindu scriptures. Seele thus names a "Red Earth Purification Ceremony", which name is linked to theories about the etymology of the name Adam according to which it means "earth", "red". The purification ceremony also constitutes a reference to the misogi, a Shinto religious ceremony of blessing. Chamber of Guf is also mentioned during Instrumentality and opened by Rei Ayanami. In the original storyboard the term indicates Lilith's stigmatas. Eva-01 is used as a "medium" (yorishiro) in the process. According to official materials, the Shinto term "medium" refers to an object that attracts divine spirits (kami) or acts as a medium through which these souls manifest. Seele also describes Instrumentality as a rite of passage; Evangelion Chronicle magazine linked the term to Arnold van Gennep's anthropological concept of the same name and the sacrament of baptism.

The film also references the psychoanalysis of Sigmund Freud, including the dichotomy between Eros and Thanatos. According to critics, the characters are constantly caught between the sexual drive and the life drive or libido and the destructive, suicidal drive of destrudo theorized by Edoardo Weiss. According to Evangelion Chronicle, the presence of destrudo in Shinji's mind is necessary to initiate Instrumentality. Scenes from the film have been interpreted as a representation of Shinji's sexual instincts, such as those in which he sees Asuka in bed or Misato having sex with her lover Ryoji Kaji. Other scenes have been interpreted as a representation of his death drive, such as the one in which he destroys a sand pyramid and the one in which he strangles Asuka and childish drawings of dead animals appear. According to writers Kazuhisa Fujie and Martin Foster, the lyrics of the film's two songs "Thanatos" and "Komm, süsser Tod" emphasize the importance of the drive dialectic for the protagonist's path. Fujie and Foster linked Instrumentality Project, in which Shinji wishes for the death of all human beings—including his own—to Thanatos and destrudo. In the final scenes of The End of Evangelion, the boy rejects the process and Yui tells him all living beings have the ability to regain their human form and the desire to continue living, enforcing the life drive. Critics also identified the psychological concept of the return to the womb in the core of Eva-01, in the stigmata and on Lilith's forehead, and in the shape of the sandpit in which Shinji as a child builds a sandcastle.

Popular culture and autobiographical inspiration 

For the plot of Neon Genesis Evangelion: The End of Evangelion, the staff took inspiration from Japanese works such as Devilman by Gō Nagai and Ideon: Be Invoked by Yoshiyuki Tomino, the final chapter of the Space Runaway Ideon series in which the extermination of the human race is proposed in a scenario similar to that of The End of Evangelion. Critics have linked the massacre of Nerv personnel to the slaughter of the Solo Ship, the Tree of Life to the Ide, and the Third Impact to the final Armageddon perpetrated by the Ideon. Anno was also influenced by the mangas Devilman and the final volume of Miyazaki's Nausicaä of the Valley of the Wind.

Other critics have compared the apocalyptic vision of The End of Evangelion to that of earlier works of science fiction, such as Greg Bear's Blood Music and Arthur C. Clarke's Childhood's End. Ex magazine reviewer Scott Rider likened "Air" to the works of Harlan Ellison, while critic Nozomi Oomori and writer Hiroyuki Morioka have compared The End of Evangelion crypticity to that of Kubrick's 2001: A Space Odyssey, as well as to widescreen baroque science fiction, which is characterized by extravagance, violence, and intricate plots. Takahashi Watanabe of Animage magazine noted an image of a planetary syzygy appears in the second half, as does one in Kubrick's 2001. Other sequences have been interpreted as a tribute to Karel Thole's illustration on the cover of Howard Fast's science-fiction collection The General Zapped an Angel, which depicts the face of a giant being lying on a red sea.

The End of Evangelion was written as a reflection of the staff's state of mind—that of Hideaki Anno in particular, who suffered depression and attempted suicide shortly after the conclusion of the series. Animage magazine Watanabe described it as a shishōsetsu (I-novel), Japanese confessional literature. Anno also described his self-exposure as a "masturbation" show in interviews. According to the interpretations of some fans, Shinji represents Anno and Asuka would represent Shinji's voice actor Miyamura, whom some had rumored was romantically involved with Anno. Fans also interpreted the violent scenes as a response to the criticism raised after the conclusion of the original series and as revenge against the fans. According to Kazuya Tsurumaki, the ending was conceived as violent and dark from the beginning; "It wasn't a bitterness toward the fans. A lot of people think anime should always have happy endings, but that's not always the case. We wanted to educate the fans that anime can have bitter endings."

The last scene

In the last scene of The End of Evangelion, Shinji awakens with Asuka on a deserted beach; Shinji strangles Asuka, who caresses his cheek. The boy begins to cry, loosening his grip, as she closes the play by saying, "I feel sick". Academic Mariana Ortega has interpreted the two characters, who escaped the Third Impact, as two Adam and Eve of a new humanity. According to Hiroyuki Morioka, everyday life will begin again. Asuka's final sentence has also become a subject of debate among fans of the series, along with Shinji's strangulation of her. The website Anime Nation considered the phrase "I feel sick" as Asuka's realization of the existence of another human being, Shinji. Asuka says the same phrase in a scene of the director's cut of the twenty-second episode; disgusted by human contact, she refuses to share space and her existence with Shinji or Misato. According to Anime Nation, Shinji strangles Asuka to prove to himself she is a distinct being, the Other, while Asuka's final words may be a reworking of Jean-Paul Sartre's quotation; "Hell is other people". In the official figurine game of the series, a similar explanation is given:
Shinji renounced the world where all hearts had melted into one and accepted each other unconditionally. His desire to live with 'others'—other hearts that would sometimes reject him, even deny him. That is why the first thing he did after coming to his senses was to place his hands around Asuka's neck. To feel the existence of an 'other'. To confirm rejection and denial.

According to the contemporary artist and writer Takashi Murakami, Shinji, by attempting to kill Asuka, is asking her for help and seeking understanding. Asuka feels disgusted because she sees Shinji as pathetic and capable of communicating only with himself, and his response represents to Murakami society's view of him. In contrast to the optimistic tone of the series finale, Shinji stops the strangulation only because he begins to cry and feels disgusted with himself. With the final sentence, Asuka regains the pride and selfishness that distinguish her character; according to critics, the words "I feel sick" suggest no character has changed or become a better person, and that the film's events have no meaning. Nozomi Omori compared the scene to J. G. Ballard's collection of science fiction short stories The Terminal Beach. Writer Kazuhiza Fujie interpreted the strangulation as a reference to the Freudian Thanatos, which is present in every moment of life, and to the impossibility of living alone, which is reflected in the title "I need you". Shinji, according to Fujie, loosens his grip by letting his libido prevail again towards the Other, Asuka, giving her his sincerity. Assistant director Tsurumaki also gave his interpretation of the sequence, saying: "Well, my personal view is, 'Do we really need to complement these troubles of the heart?' Regardless of whether or not we are complemented, have troubles, or find our answers, interpersonal relations exist, and the world goes on. I thought the last scene meant to say that life goes on, but I could be wrong".

Critique of otaku 
The End of Evangelion takes up the main message of the classic series, creating a "story of communication". The feature film has been interpreted as a criticism of otaku—obsessive fans of animation, video games, and comic books. Hideaki Anno, a former otaku, considers them excessively closed, self-referential, and introverted; after the end of the series, he criticized fans who were absorbed by the Internet and escaping from reality, saying their opinions are like "graffiti in public toilets". In 1996, Anno said he was disappointed with the reception of the original series, which had become a place of refuge in which to escape from unpleasant things. He then received criticism, and said; "My own feeling is all about the message I put at the beginning of the twenty-sixth episode. There is no fiction in that shot. It's real, and it's true". His intention with The End of Evangelion was to "purify" viewers, make them wake up, and return to the real world. In Anno's view, such criticism, despite its appearance, is a form of "fan service that doesn't seem fan service", because it is still useful to viewers. According to Kazuya Tsurumaki:
But when all is said and done, Hideaki Anno's comments on Evangelion are that it is a message aimed at anime fans including himself, and of course, me too. In other words, it's useless for non-anime fans to watch it. If a person who can already live and communicate normally watches it, they won't learn anything. ... Don't drag the past around. Find the next thing that interests you. ... It's always better to let something that has finished [Evangelion] end.

Instrumentality, in which the individual's physical existence fades into an accommodating cosmic fusion, has been interpreted as a metaphor for the plight of otaku. The film, according to Japanese critic Manabu Tsuribe, ends at the moment when Shinji recognizes Asuka as a being separate from himself, the Other who can never be completely internalized by consciousness, rejecting Instrumentality. For Shinji, interpreted by some as a representative of otaku and Anno, Asuka is an ambiguous existence that escapes his control and her ambiguity represents the ambiguity of Evangelion; their relationship is marked by violence and possessiveness, in an ironic criticism of the escapist tendency of animation fans, who are unable to relate to other people and closed in their interiority. According to Nozomi Omori, the film is about "living with anime", and would be interpretable as Anno's attempt to argue with himself. Omori and Tsuribe both compared The End of Evangelion to Mamoru Oshii's Urusei Yatsura 2: Beautiful Dreamer, in which the setting is found to be a dream, a world based on Lam's wishes, and one returns to an animated reality, while in Evangelion "after hearing 'I feel sick' one cannot return to the animated world" and is immediately thrown into real life.

In the second part of The End of Evangelion, Shinji argues with Rei Ayanami, questioning the nature of dreams. During the live scene, Ayanami tells him one cannot dream alone because it would not be a dream, only an alternative to reality, accusing him of wanting to deceive reality with his fantasy. Along with Rei's spoken lines, photographs of graffiti on Gainax offices and images of fans at Shinjuku Milano cinema appear on the screen, so the concept of the dream has been interpreted as a metaphor for anime. In the overlay, the authors inserted the caption ; the question, according to a pamphlet on The End of Evangelion, is addressed to both fans and staff members of Neon Genesis Evangelion. According to Yūichirō Oguro, editor of materials from the home video editions of the series, the segment was included to show animation fans have the same problems as Shinji and criticizing fans who take refuge in fiction. According to Andrea Fontana, a writer and scholar of Japanese animation, at that moment the otaku "could admire themselves, discuss themselves, just as Shinji did with himself", interpreting the scene as "a desirable rebirth for everyone". At the end of filming, moreover, the Lilith in Rei's guise dismembers and Shinji rejects the cosmic fusion of Instrumentality. According to Oguro, the series' most popular character Rei represents Neon Genesis Evangelion pleasure principle and her dismemberment indicates the end of the otaku dream and a return to the real world.

Release

Marketing
A wide range of merchandising products dedicated to The End of Evangelion, including posters, drinks, action figures, keychains, chairs, bags, and clothing, was distributed for the release. An official, A4-sized, illustrated booklet about Evangelion dubbed Red Cross Book by Western fans containing explanations and interviews with staff and voice actors, was sold in theaters for ¥800. In 1997, Kadokawa Shoten released two anime comics on The End of Evangelion: one on "Air", on October 28, 1997, and the other on "Sincerely Yours", on November 18 of the same year.

Bandai distributed a trading card game called , which was released in September 1998 as a supplement to the Japanese magazine RPG. The production materials such as storyboards, sketches, and preparatory studies were collected in two books called Groundwork of Evangelion: The Movie, which were published on October 26, 2001, and January 18, 2002, respectively. In 2012, during the Shiohaku Expo 2012 event, a reproduction of Rei Ayanami's character was built near the headquarters of Nippon Television, taking inspiration from the scene in which Rei assumes a giant size after joining Lilith.

Japanese release

Neon Genesis Evangelion: The End of Evangelion was released in Japanese theaters on July 19, 1997. Pre-sales began on May 17; customers with unused tickets for Death and Rebirth were permitted to use them for the movie. Viewers were given copies of the film's official poster. A preview was held on July 17 at Yomiuri Hall Cinema. In 1998, the feature films Death & Rebirth (1997) and The End of Evangelion (1997), partially overlapping, were merged by removing the part in common and re-released as Revival of Evangelion, which was released in theaters on March 7, attracting 300,000 people. In 2006, The End of Evangelion was screened as part of the Tokyo International Film Festival in Akihabara. In 2014, the Revival of Evangelion version was screened at Toho Cinemas in Nihonbashi during the 27th edition of the same festival. On August 28 and 29, 2015, to celebrate the release of the Blu-ray box set of the series, the film was played along with the first episode of Neon Genesis Evangelion, "Angel Attack", at Toho Cinema in Shinjuku, Tokyo. On December 4, 2020, it was announced a new run for Revival of Evangelion in special screenings across Japan between January 8 and 22, 2021.

Home video release

On August 12 and September 9, 1998, two Laserdiscs called "Genesis 0:13" and "Genesis 0:14" containing "Air" and "Sincerely Yours" were released as part of the home video edition of the original series. On December 23, 1998, of the same year, a Japanese Laserdisc box set called  containing a version of Death & Rebirth called Death(true)² and both segments of The End of Evangelion was released. The box set also included extras, an illustrated booklet, and the storyboards of the feature films. In June 2001, the films were released as part of a release called Second Impact Box.

In 2003, Gainax released a DVD edition of the animated series called "Renewal"; The End of Evangelion sound was significantly improved with a new 5.1ch surround sound track. The dialogue, music, and sound effects were reviewed and remixed under Anno's direction; musics were also remixed for 5.1ch. The stereo mix for "Magokoro wo, kimi ni" took place on March 12 and 13, the one for "Air" on March 15, 2003. The new version of The End of Evangelion was included in the tenth release of the Renewal edition and production materials were included on the eleventh DVD; a DVD box set containing all twenty-six episodes of the series and the two concluding feature films was released in June of the same year. The films were excluded from the "Western Platinum Edition", which is based on the Japanese Renewal. A version of the discarded live-action sequence was included in "Renewal of Evangelion" and subsequent Blu-ray editions. Although it is incomplete due to the loss of original materials after the plan was changed mid-filming, Hideaki Anno chose to recreate, as much as possible without additional filming or recording, the concept he had at that time. Shinji's line at the end, which had not been recorded at the time, was added in by Anno himself.

King Records released a box set with Revival on August 1, 2007, under the title "Neon Genesis Evangelion DVD-Box '07 Edition". In August 2015, to celebrate the series' 20th anniversary, The End of Evangelion was released in a Blu-ray box set of Neon Genesis Evangelion in HD video. In June 2019, in conjunction with the release on Netflix, the Blu-rays were re-released.

English-language release

North American company A.D. Vision, which was responsible for the adaptation of the original series, was initially not interested in acquiring The End of Evangelion distribution rights because Gainax demanded too high a fee for the licenses. In July 1998, A.D. Vision announced it would negotiate with Gainax to release the film overseas. In 2001, the rights were purchased for two million dollars by the company Manga Entertainment. The company announced the release of the Western edition of The End of Evangelion for October of the same year but the release was postponed. Manga Entertainment initially stated they would interview Hideaki Anno and Kazuya Tsurumaki to provide Western fans with an explanation of the feature film, but no interviews were included in the final DVD release and the release date was again postponed to September 2002.

Rei Ayanami's English-language voice actor Amanda Winn Lee wrote the script for The End of Evangelion English subtitles and dubbed adaptations, and produced and directed the dub. While most of the voice actors reprised their roles in ADV's English adaptation of the television series, several supporting roles were recast because the original actors were unavailable. To accommodate voice actors living in different parts of the US, the dub was recorded in Los Angeles, Houston, and New York City. In late 2020, GKIDS acquired the theatrical and home-video rights to the film, the Death (True)² version of Death, and the television series.

The End of Evangelion was included in the Standard Edition, the Collector's Edition and the Ultimate Edition, all of which were released on Blu-ray on November 9, 2021. GKids also included extra content, such as the deleted live-action scene and a short documentary about its making. In the United Kingdom, the company Anime Limited screened Death (True)² and The End of Evangelion in theaters on November 11 and 14, 2021.

Reception

Box office and public response

In 1997, Neon Genesis Evangelion in Japan was at the center of national debates and became a social phenomenon. It thus attracted to theaters a large number of people who were intrigued by the controversy surrounding the original ending. The film version also drew the attention of newspapers, as well as people who were not normally interested in animation. The End of Evangelions audience exceeded that of Death and Rebirth, drawing 400,000 viewers in the first three days of its release. Hayao Miyazaki's Princess Mononoke, which also has mature and violent themes, was released in theaters at the same time as The End of Evangelion; Japanese media were attracted by the contrast between the two films' posters, one of which said "Live!" and The End of Evangelion which reported the line "Wouldn't it be nice if everyone would just die?". Anticipation was high; In Japan, long lines formed for tickets to the premiere, drawing additional media attention.

The End of Evangelion became controversial due to its scenes of sex and violence. Discussions were generated by the opening scene, in which Shinji masturbates over Asuka's body, which fans considered one of the most unpleasant in the history of Japanese animation. The debate on the two endings of Evangelion continued, remaining a source of controversy on the Internet even twenty years after the film's release. Further controversy occurred when the film aired at midnight on August 25, 2014, on Nippon Television. NTV cut and censored some sequences, provoking protests from both fans and the authors. On August 30 of the same year, it was broadcast on the TBS television network at 2:53 am, gaining an audience share of 0.9%.

The film's soundtrack album, which was released in September 1997, sold over 100,000 copies in its debut week. Sales exceeded expectations and the album entered the top-three albums on the Oricon charts, which no anime soundtrack since Galaxy Express 999 had achieved, and which remained the case for another ten years. The soundtrack sold about 400,000 units, together with 600,000 copies of the single "Thanatos". According to a 2015 estimate by Merumo.ne.jp, The End of Evangelion grossed two-and-a-half billion yen in total, or over  since 1997. Manga Entertainment's English edition was also successful, taking the twentieth spot among the best-selling DVDs of its debut week in the US.

In 1998, The End of Evangelion reached number one in the Anime Grand Prix, an annual survey of the best anime of the moment by the Japanese magazine Animage. The song "Thanatos - If I Can't Be Yours" emerged fourth in the category related to the best music tracks. Time Out New York polled animators and directors about the best animated movies; The End of Evangelion eventually reached 65th place. According to Comic Book Resources, The End of Evangelion was with 8.51 points one of the anime purchased by Netflix with the highest deck on the MyAnimeList platform in 2020, and with a score of 8.1 among the most-popular Japanese animated films on the Internet Movie Database in 2021.

Critical response 
The End of Evangelion received critical praise and since its release it was frequently rated as one of the best animated features of all time. Paste listed it in 46th place, praising its surrealism and experimentalism, while Japanese film magazine Cut named it third. According to Legit.ng, it is among the best fifteen action films in Japanese animation history. Writer Patrick Macias named it the third-best film in history, describing it as the most important anime films of the 1990s, while Slant Magazine ranked it 42nd among the best one hundred science-fiction films ever produced. Anime News Network's Nick Creamer decreed it the best ending in Japanese animation history, praising Asuka's strangulation scene as one of the most cathartic images in any medium. The battle between Asuka and the nine units of the Eva Series, on the other hand, was described by Real Live as a scene that "probably left a mark on the history of Japanese animation", and as "the beating heart of the film" by Comic Book Resources. Anime News Network's Mike Crandol also praised the battle against the Eva Series as qualitatively superior to all of the fights in the classic series. On review aggregator Rotten Tomatoes, the film holds an approval rating of 90%, based on ninve reviews, and an average rating of 8.70/10, ranking among the highest rated Japanese feature films acquired by Netflix.  DVD Talk's Earl Cressey described The End of Evangelion as a "multi-layered epic, much of which is a bizarre, ambiguous, abstract, and disturbing journey", and Digitally Obsessed as "one of the most unique Japanese animated features since Akira".

The violent scenes and underlying pessimism were generally well-received. Several reviewers praised the action scenes, animation, soundtrack, themes, and direction. Animage magazine, among others, praised the apocalyptic vision of The End of Evangelion, calling it "a beautiful nightmarish spectacle [that] overwhelms the viewer". Little White Lies's Kambole Campbell praised the animation, the apocalyptic themes, and Anno's breaking of the fourth wall with the use of animatics, hand-drawn sketches, and live-action shots. Movie Mezzanine, Vice's Gita Jackson and Mania.com reviewers called it "a masterpiece" and Steven Lochran of The Cheers said it is "an epic in the greatest sense of the word". Hideaki Anno's animation and direction received praise from Michael Johnson of the site Monsters At Play and writer Dani Cavallaro, who described the metaphysical scenes of "Sincerely Yours" as "a dense visual poetry so multilayered as to invite endless speculation". The website Phantasmagoria appreciated the flashback about little Shinji at the park and its retro effect, as well as the live-action sequences, while Sagisu's soundtrack received praise from Tiffani Nadeau of Mania.com.

Other reviewers were confused by the plot, finding some scenes confusing and the philosophical musings out of place. The Anime Review described The End of Evangelion as "pretentious and incoherent", while Gizmodo's Rob Bricken criticized its nihilism and pessimism. THEM Anime Reviews's Carlos Ross also said the film's second half "is so incoherent and obtuse that it completely loses the mainstream audience (and in fact, virtually any audience) this series has attracted before". Ross also said The End of Evangelion "goes beyond art film ... and beyond anime. And in doing so, it goes beyond the audience's capability to understand and be entertained, which defeats the purpose of something labeled as entertainment." Matthew Wise of The Anime Cafe criticized its character development and heavy philosophical references, preferring the final episode of the classic series. According to Anime-Planet, The End of Evangelion "falls apart under its own philosophical weight"; the reviewer criticized its "pompous symbolism", calling it "pretentious and disappointing", and concluded the review by saying the film "is certainly down there among some of the worst anime that I have seen".

The website Screen Crush listed The End of Evangelion among the most disorienting films in film history. Newtype USA panned it, calling it the "saga of bamboozlement", criticizing its "biblical overtones, teen melodrama and bad parenting", eliciting protests from Manga Entertainment, The End of Evangelion North American distributor. The film's cultural references were praised by other critics, such as Mark Schilling and Chris Luedtke of Passport Cinema, and was defended by writer Brain Camp, who wrote; "Not all great anime is meant to be understood on first viewing ... You don't always have to understand something to enjoy it. A work of great art in a museum or gallery is not always easily understood but one can still be gripped by it." Ryan Atkinson of Cultured Vultures praised the power of the introspective scenes in the final segment, which he said "allow for a deeper understanding that other films have not tried to achieve". Chris Beveridge of Mania.com also judged the density of symbolism positively: "From trash to philosophical enlightenment, action extravaganza to a movie heavy in symbolism. Interpretations will vary greatly, and that to me is a sign of a very good movie."

Awards
The End of Evangelion was honored at the Awards of the Japanese Academy, the Animation Kobe and the 15th Golden Gloss Award.

Legacy
According to Dazed magazine, The End of Evangelion was an influence on Wes Anderson's film Isle of Dogs (2018), noting that Anderson was a fan of the original animated series. The fight sequence between Asuka's Eva-02 and the nine Eva Series was a source of inspiration for animators such as Yoshimichi Kameda and Yokota Takumi, character designer of Love Live! Nijigasaki High School Idol Club. The film inspired Tetsuya Ogawa of L'Arc~en~Ciel, who wrote a song titled  taking cues from Asuka's character, hoping she would be able to express her emotions during the film. The band Parkway Drive used clips from the film for their album Don't Close Your Eyes.

Mangaka Nobuhiro Watsuki lauded "the dramatization, the movement, and the editing" of the film and stated that, "As a writer, I was able to take home something from it". Quotations from and references to the film have been identified by critics in the American animated series Steven Universe, in One Hour Photo by Mark Romanek, in the anime Claymore, Sayonara, Zetsubou-Sensei, Keroro Gunso and in the last episode of Devilman Crybaby, an adaptation of Nagai's manga that inspired Hideaki Anno. The Chinese animated feature film One Hundred Thousand Bad Jokes also pays homage to The End of Evangelion in its final sequences, in which a musical piece similar to "Komm, süsser Tod" is heard. According to IndieWire's David Ehrlich, an apocalyptic scenario similar to that of The End of Evangelion is presented in the video game Death Stranding, scripted and directed by Hideo Kojima.

References

Notes

Citations

Bibliography

External links 

 
 
 
 
 "The Economy of Visual Language: Neon Genesis Evangelion", Slant Magazine
 Early drafts of Episodes 25' and 26' at EvaGeeks

1997 films
1997 action films
1997 anime films
1990s coming-of-age films
1990s psychological drama films
1997 science fiction films
Animated films based on animated series
Anime films composed by Shirō Sagisu
Apocalyptic films
Coming-of-age drama films
Films about depression
Films directed by Hideaki Anno
Films directed by Kazuya Tsurumaki
Films with screenplays by Hideaki Anno
Films set in the 2010s
Films with live action and animation
Films based on urban legends
Gainax
Japanese animated science fiction films
Japanese coming-of-age films
Japanese psychological drama films
Japanese science fiction action films
Manga Entertainment
Mecha anime and manga
Neon Genesis Evangelion films
Animated post-apocalyptic films
Production I.G
Religion in science fiction
Films about impact events
1997 drama films
Metaphysical fiction films
Existentialist films
Films about consciousness
Postmodern films